Jersey cricket team hosted Guernsey cricket team from 17 to 18 August 2018 to contest the inaugural T20 Inter-Insular Cup, a series consisting of three Twenty20 (T20) matches. The series took place at Farmers' Field in Saint Martin. The two sides had played an Inter-Insular match annually since 1950, generally as timed or 50-over contests. For the first time, the 2018 Inter-Insular was played as a three-match Twenty20 series.

The series provided preparation for both teams ahead of the European T20 qualifying tournament for the 2019 ICC Men's T20 World Cup Qualifier; both teams named the same squad for the two events. Despite several senior players being unavailable for selection, Jersey whitewashed Guernsey to win the series 3–0.

Following the International Cricket Council's decision to grant T20I status to all matches played between Associate Members after 1 January 2019, future editions of the Inter-Insular T20 Cup (starting from the 2019 edition) will have this enhanced status. In 2019, the traditional 50-over Inter-Insular Trophy match returned in addition to the Inter-Insular T20 Cup, which would now have a separate trophy awarded.

T20 series

Squads

1st T20

2nd T20

3rd T20

See also
 Inter-Insular cricket
 2019 T20 Inter-Insular Cup

References

External links
 Series home at ESPN Cricinfo

Cricket in Jersey